Barbara "Mary Lucy" Dosh (September 15, 1839 – December 29, 1861) was a Catholic sister in the order of the Sisters of Nazareth. She was a volunteer nurse in Western Kentucky during the American Civil War, caring for both Union troops and Confederate prisoners of war, and died in the course of duty from typhoid fever. In 2012, the United States Congress passed a resolution honoring Dosh's nursing care given to both Union and Confederate soldiers.

Early life and education
Barbara Dosh was born in Luzerne County, Pennsylvania, on September 15, 1839. She was orphaned at age 11 and she and her sister went to live in Louisville, Kentucky, with the Sisters of Charity of Nazareth. Dosh's talent for music was recognized by Mother Catherine Spalding of the Sisters of Charity of Nazareth and she went to St. Vincent in Union County, Kentucky, to study music.

Dosh decided to join the order of the Sisters of Nazareth and took the name Sister Mary Lucy Dosh. She went to Paducah, Kentucky, to teach music at St Mary's Academy in McCracken County.
.

American Civil War
In 1861 Dosh volunteered as a nurse during the American Civil War in Western Kentucky. She cared for both Union troops and Confederate prisoners of war at the Paducah Baptist Church.

Death and legacy
While serving as a nurse, Dosh died of typhoid fever on December 29, 1861, a few months into the Civil War. Her casket was carried on the U.S. gunboat Peacock up the Ohio River to Uniontown, Kentucky, under an order of truce with an escort of six Union soldiers and six Confederate soldiers. She was buried in the St. Vincent Academy cemetery.  In December, 2012 the United States Congress passed a resolution honoring Dosh's nursing care given to both Union and Confederate soldiers.

References

External links

1839 births
1861 deaths
People from Luzerne County, Pennsylvania
People of Pennsylvania in the American Civil War
19th-century American Roman Catholic nuns
Sisters of Charity Federation in the Vincentian-Setonian Tradition
People from Union County, Kentucky
People of Kentucky in the American Civil War
Deaths from typhoid fever
Infectious disease deaths in Kentucky
American Civil War nurses
American women nurses
Kentucky women in health professions
Catholics from Pennsylvania
Catholics from Kentucky
Civilians killed in the American Civil War